Men's Downhill World Cup 1969/1970

Final point standings

In men's downhill World Cup 1969/70 the best 3 results count. Deductions are given in brackets.

References
 fis-ski.com

External links
 

Men's Downhill
FIS Alpine Ski World Cup men's downhill discipline titles